The People's Liberation Army Astronaut Corps (PLAAC), also known as the Chinese Astronaut Corps, is a Beijing-based sub-corps-level People's Liberation Army Strategic Support Force (PLASSF) unit directly under the PLASSF Space Systems Department (PLASSF-SSD) and is responsible for the selection and training of astronaut corps for Project 921, the Chinese manned space program.

History 
In October 1992, a Commission for Science, Technology and Industry for National Defense-PLAAF joint task force started the preliminary selection for astronauts; 1,506 pilots were identified and twelve were chosen as candidates. The Astronaut Corps was established in January 1998 and the twelve along with two PLAAF trainees sent to Yuri Gagarin Cosmonaut Training Center in 1996 forms Chinese Group 1.

Seven pilots entered the Astronaut Corps in May 2010 as Group 2.

In 2014, Group 1 astronauts Wu Jie, Li Qinglong, Chen Quan, Zhao Chuandong, and Pan Zhanchun retired from the Astronaut Corps due to age; none of them had flown in a mission.

The Astronaut Corps was part of the General Armaments Department until GAD was disbanded in January 2016. As part of the 2015 military reform, it became part of the Strategic Support Force.

In January and March 2018, China Manned Space Engineering Office vice director, astronaut Yang Liwei stated that Group 3 selection was expected to begin in 2018 and would include engineers and mission specialists. Yang also stated that Group 3 would include civilians from industry and research institutions.

See also 
 List of Chinese astronauts
 Canadian Astronaut Corps
 European Astronaut Corps
 NASA Astronaut Corps
 List of astronauts by selection
 Human spaceflight
 History of spaceflight

References 

 
1998 establishments in China
People's Liberation Army Strategic Support Force
Space units and formations
Space program of the People's Republic of China
Chinese astronauts
Military units and formations established in 1998